The 1973–74 Scottish Inter-District Championship was a rugby union competition for Scotland's district teams.

This season saw the 21st Scottish Inter-District Championship.

Glasgow District won the competition with 3 wins.

1973-74 League Table

Results

References

1973–74 in Scottish rugby union
Scottish Inter-District Championship seasons